Mak Bing-wing (1915–1984) was a Chinese actor active in Cantonese opera.

Born in 1915 in Guangdong, he attended Wah Yan College, Hong Kong and began his acting career in the 1930s. He left Hong Kong in 1941 for a tour of the United States, returning in 1947. after the Pacific War had ended. While  in the United States, Mak appeared in many Grandview Film Company productions. His third marriage, to Yu So-chow in 1966, produced three children. The two later played lead characters in  the Film A Ten-Year Dream. Mak died in the United States in 1984, where he and Yu had retired.

Repertoire 
 A Mismatched Couple
 The Perfect Match
 When Swallows Return
 The Heroes and the Beauty
 A Triumphant Return
 Romance by the Peach Blossom Lake
 The Revenge
 Return From Battle for His Love
 Ten Years Dream (aka Ten-Year Dream of Yangzhou)
 The Princess in Distress (aka Romance of the Phoenix Chamber)
 A Maid Commander-in-Chief and a Rash General
 A Lady Prime Minister of Two Countries
 The Villain, The General and the Heroic Beauty
 Two Heroic Families
 Power and Dilemma
 No Return Without Victory
 An Agnostic and Sagacious Intercession
 The God's Story

Filmography

Films 
This is a partial list of films. (See , Hkmdb & Imdb page for Mak.) 
 1950 A Chivalrous Bandit 
 1955 Love in a Dangerous City (opposite actor Chan Fai-lung, the Dan)
 1957 The Nymph of the River Lo++
 1958 A Buddhist Recluse for 14 Years++
 1958 Lady Wen's Return to the Han People-+
 1958 Flower of the Night-+
 1959 The Brave Daughters of Han-+
-+Opposite Yim Fun Fong
++Opposite Fong and Yam Kim-fai

 A Ten-Year Dream
 A Lady Prime Minister of Two Countries
 Return from Battle for His Love
 Romance of the Phoenix Chamber
 The Unruly Commander-in-chief and the Blunt General (aka A Maid Commander-in-Chief and a Rash General)
 No Return Without Victory
 An Agnostic and Sagacious Intercession
 Knight of the Victory Marked Flag

References

External links
 Mak Bing-wing（1915.12.19–1984.9.13) ‘biographical notes'. PDF 
 
 
 

1915 births
1984 deaths
Hong Kong male Cantonese opera actors
20th-century Chinese male actors
Chinese male stage actors
Male actors from Guangzhou
Chinese emigrants to the United States
Musicians from Guangzhou
Singers from Guangdong
20th-century Hong Kong male actors
20th-century Hong Kong male singers
20th-century Chinese  male singers